Supanara Sukhasvasti na Ayudhya (often S.N.A. for the second name; ; RTGS: Suphanara Suksawat Na Ayutthaya, born June 11, 1992 in Chiang Mai) is a Thai long jumper.  By winning the gold in the long jump at the 2009 World Youth Championships in Athletics, he became Thailand's first ever finalist, medallist and champion in an athletics global event of any age category.  He is also the Thai record holder in the long jump.

Career

At the 2009 World Youth Championships in Athletics, Suksawasti won the gold in the long jump with a distance of 7.65 m. He also won a silver in the triple jump with a distance of 15.70 m.

On 5 June 2010, he became the first athlete of Southeast Asia  to leap over 8.00 meters in long jump when he registered 8.04 (+1.4) during the Asian Grand Prix in Bangalore. A few weeks later, he took the silver medal in the long jump behind Lin Ching-Hsuan at the 2010 Asian Junior Athletics Championships. At the 2011 Asian Athletics Championships in Kobe, Suksawasti won a silver medal in the long jump behind Chinese jumper Su Xiongfeng.  It was his first medal in a senior meet.

Personal

Supanara Sukhasvasti na Ayudhya is a descendant of King Rama IV.

Personal bests
.

Key:  NR = National record

References

External links

1992 births
Living people
Supanara Sukhasvasti
Supanara Sukhasvasti
Supanara Sukhasvasti
Athletes (track and field) at the 2012 Summer Olympics
Athletes (track and field) at the 2010 Asian Games
Athletes (track and field) at the 2014 Asian Games
Southeast Asian Games medalists in athletics
Supanara Sukhasvasti
Competitors at the 2011 Southeast Asian Games
Competitors at the 2015 Southeast Asian Games
Supanara Sukhasvasti
Supanara Sukhasvasti
Supanara Sukhasvasti
Supanara Sukhasvasti